Pig Hunt is a 2008 American science fiction action horror thriller film directed by James Isaac, it was written by Robert Mailer Anderson and Zack Anderson. In the film, a group faces a monstrous wild boar while trying to survive vengeful rednecks and a deranged cult of hot girls. The film includes several original songs by Les Claypool, who also plays a minor role as the preacher.

This was the last film directed by James Isaac before his death in 2012.

Plot

The film begins with a man running for his life through the forest, obviously in a panic he hides behind a tree, trying to spot what was following him. As he looks around, something comes up from behind him, throwing him up into the air and back down again. The man screams as something begins eating him, and as the man dies, the camera turns to a pair of dog tags that are slowly overtaken by a small river of blood.

John Hickman (Travis Aaron Wade) and his girlfriend Brooks (Tina Huang) are a pair of San Francisco residents who invite their friends, self-proclaimed tough guy and wannabe soldier Ben (Howard Johnson Jr.), his close friend Wayne (Rajiv Shah), as well as chef Quincy (Trevor Bullock) and his dog Wolfgang, to a weekend of hunting, drinking and fun and camping near John's uncle's cabin, in a remote mountain area. Ben and Wayne can't stand Brooks, and the feeling is mutual — they spend much of the trip getting on each other's nerves. En route, they stop at a gas station/general store for directions and encounter a van of hippie women and their cult leader, the Hippie Stranger, (Bryonn Bain) who live in a commune in the woods, presumably raising emus for meat. From the store owner, they learn about a local legend called "The Ripper," a legendary killer hog which supposedly weighs several thousand pounds. After obtaining some supplies and directions, they make their way to the cabin, passing through a hillbilly homestead belonging to the Tibbs clan, all of whom drop what they are doing to watch them pass by. One young boy is perched in a tree, and drops a dead animal carcass on the hood of their car as they pass underneath. When they get to John's uncle's cabin, they find it has been vandalized and is uninhabitable, though John maintains the rednecks down the road weren't responsible. The group pitches their tents and camps outside.

The next morning, they encounter methamphetamine-addicted hillbilly brothers Jake (Jason Foster) and Ricky Tibbs, (Nick Tagas) cousins of John's, who are interested in joining them on a wild hog hunt. An old feud still exists between John and Ricky, who is a Gulf War veteran showing signs of drug addiction and mental illness. His brother Jake appears to be the only person maintaining control and keeping Ricky from flying off the handle. Quincy, who is eager to get to know them, is obviously inexperienced in any sort of outdoor activities, and Ricky accuses Wolfgang of being a "pet" not a "dog" seeming equally oblivious to hunting as well. When Jake Tibbs sets up some targets to see how well the others can shoot, boastful Ben makes a fool of himself, not being able to hit the target even once, while Wayne hits it not more than a couple of times. Brooks outshoots both men, to their surprise and chagrin — she impresses Tibbs by hitting the target with every shot.

As the group makes their trip through the woods, they encounter an area called the Big Wallow, and, using a piglet call as a lure, they manage to attract several pigs to their location. One of them rams into Wayne's leg at full charge giving him a compound fracture at the kneecap and incapacitating him. Wolfgang goes charging after the boars while Brooks shows off her marksmanship talents and kills one of them. Ricky calls Jake to come look at something disturbing he's observed while skinning and dressing the hog they killed. Though adult-sized, it has no protective armor over its shoulders — it is not a full grown animal as they had thought, but a piglet — a very, very big piglet. Just as everyone is beginning to wonder about the truth of the Ripper legend, Quincy reappears, very excited. While looking for his dog Wolfgang, he had encountered a large crop of marijuana plants and now leads the others to it, leaving Brooks with Wayne.

A conflict emerges when John objects to Jake and Ricky taking the plants for profit, as they are growing on his property and he wants no part of it. There is also a strange and disturbing sign posted near the plants, which leads John to think that the hippies that he thought were raising emus are actually growing pot instead. During the ensuing argument, Ricky snaps, and holds John at bay with a crossbow. John and Jake Tibbs are trying to gain control of the situation, when Ben arrives on the scene, thinks Ricky is about to kill John, and shoots him. Jake flees to tell his clan, and the others return to Wayne and Brooks. Quincy and Ben start making their way back to the cabin while Brooks and John leave Wayne to find something to make a stretcher with so they can carry him out of there and get back to the cabin and their vehicle. Shortly after their departure, Wayne is attacked by something we don't see, and manages to fire off a single round. Brooks and John circle back and find him missing, as well as Ricky's body.

Meanwhile, Ben and Quincy make their way back to the cabin. They find Wolfgang's mutilated body, and determine he was killed by the Tibbs clan. Ricky and Jake's clan make their appearance, Ben manages to kill his pursuer and escape, but Quincy is knocked out of the vehicle he was attempting to escape in, and is executed by a single gunshot to the back of the head. At the same time, John and Brooks run into the mysterious Hippie Stranger as they hide in the forest; he is carrying a cattle prod, and tells them that he is looking for an escaped animal, and that they can contact the police from his commune. He helps them beat off an attack by the murderous Tibbs clan, and several hillbillies are killed. In the meantime, Ben has found the commune, where he is given drugs by several beautiful hippie women, and led into an enormous, muddy pen. He encounters a dying Wayne, who says that something has been eating him. Ben turns in shock as something approaches him from behind, and screams.

The remaining Tibbs clan members have reached the woods around the commune. They are stalked and killed, one by one, by the murderous hippie women — all except one man, who is seized by something else — something horrifying that we don't see. Brooks and John arrive at the commune with the Hippie Stranger. When John questions why Ben's equipment is there, but not Ben himself, they force him into a cell while the leader takes Brooks out into the pen. At last, we are shown what has been attacking people throughout the movie — it is the legendary Ripper, who is carrying the remains of one of the redneck clan in his mouth. Meanwhile, Jake makes his way into the commune, and is confronted by some of the women. He shoots a couple of them, and forces one of the women to let him into John's cell. As Jake sees the Ripper out in the pen and freezes in shock, the hippie woman he brought with him attacks, stabbing him in the eye with her boar's tooth necklace before John kills her. Jake dies from his wounds while the Hippie Stranger prepares to sacrifice Brooks to the boar, whom he and his followers have for some bizarre reason been worshiping and feeding unwary people to. Brooks gets a hold of the Stranger's cattle prod and pokes him with it, causing him to cry out, attracting the Ripper's attention. The creature eviscerates him, and Brooks remains as quiet as possible as John forces his way from the cell. Using a crossbow, he fires an arrow up under the boar's jaw, killing it. As Brooks and John make their escape, they come face to face with a young, wild member of the Tibbs clan — the feral little fellow who was sitting in a tree at the beginning of the movie.

Cast

 Travis Aaron Wade as John Hickman
 Tina Huang as Brooks
 Howard Johnson Jr. as Ben
 Trevor Bullock as Quincy
 Rajiv Shah as Wayne
 Jason Foster as Jake
 Nick Tagas as Ricky
 Phillip K. Torretto as Beer Belly Redneck
 Cimi Ahluwalia as Cimi
 Robert Mailer Anderson as Big Train
 Bryonn Bain as Hippie Stranger
 Vince Ballew as Gas Mask
 Max Barnett as ZZ Driver
 Leanne Borghesi as Darlene
 Ty Brenneman as Sexy Cult Girl
 Cara Cameron as Cult Girl
 Les Claypool as Preacher
 Lane Foard as Lex Wockenfuss
 Lanie Grainger as Poppy
 Marissa Ingrasci as Sage
 India Isaac as India
 Joe Lucas as Homeless Vet
 Christina McKay as Crystal
 Charlie Musselwhite as Charlie
 Henrietta "Henri" Musselwhite as Woman Shelving Cans of Creamed Corn
 Chris Paxton as Billy Stankbud
 Michelle Redwine as Willow
 Luis Saguar as TJ
 Karen Viola as Cult Girl
 Stephanie Voelckers as Rain

Production

Pig Hunt Productions shoot the film in spring 2008 in Boonville, California and The Haight District, San Francisco. Rob and Zack Anderson characterized the script responsible for Epic Pictures Group. The shooting cost about 6 million US dollars.

Soundtrack
The Memphis-based film composer David E. Russo scored the soundtrack.

Release
The film premiered at the Fantasia Film Festival on July 21, 2008. It had its West Coast premiere in the United States on May 5, 2009.  The film is part of the 2010 Fangoria FrightFest.

Home release
Lightning Media released the DVD and Blu-ray in July 2010 with a bonus behind-the-scenes documentary with a total length of about 40 minutes.

Reception

In a positive review, Sean Smithson of Twitch Film states that Pig Hunt is a cult film in which "the story is the star".  Joshua Siebalt of DreadCentral rated the film 0.5/5 and called it misogynistic, immature, and annoying.  Bill Gibron of DVD Talk rated the film 4/5 and described it as "wholly original" yet strongly influenced by many other films.  Heidi Williams of The Oregonian rated it C- and wrote that it "comes off... like a SciFi Channel B movie."  Jeremy Knox of Film Threat rated the film 3/5 stars and called it "a flawed, but really fun film".  In a mixed review, Dennis Harvey of Variety called it "enjoyably offbeat" but "not entirely satisfying".  Mick LaSalle of the SF Gate rated the film 3/5 stars and called it "a routine thriller" that is pretty good for what it is.

References

External links
 
 
 

2008 films
2008 horror films
2008 action thriller films
American action thriller films
American science fiction horror films
Films directed by James Isaac
Films shot in California
Films shot in San Francisco
American natural horror films
2000s English-language films
2000s American films